Ola Sundt Ravnestad (born May 31, 1961 in Gloppen, Norway) is a Norwegian businessperson, banker and entrepreneur. He was the chief executive officer of the bank alliance Terra-Gruppen, that he founded along with a number of savings banks in the year 1997.

Sundt Ravnestad is an educated marine engineer, and siviløkonom(literally "civil economist"), from BI Norwegian Business School.

References 

1961 births
Living people
Norwegian bankers
Eika Gruppen
BI Norwegian Business School alumni
People from Gloppen